Óscar Martín Ramos Salinas (born 9 September 1963) is a Mexican politician affiliated with the New Alliance Party. As of 2014 he served as Deputy of the LIX Legislature of the Mexican Congress representing Tamaulipas.

References

1963 births
Living people
Politicians from Tamaulipas
New Alliance Party (Mexico) politicians
21st-century Mexican politicians
Deputies of the LIX Legislature of Mexico
Members of the Chamber of Deputies (Mexico) for Tamaulipas